Sons of the Desert is a 1933 American pre-Code comedy film starring Laurel and Hardy. Directed by William A. Seiter, it was released in the United States on December 29, 1933. In the United Kingdom, the film was originally released under the title Fraternally Yours.

In 2012, the film was deemed "culturally, historically, or aesthetically significant" by the United States Library of Congress and selected for preservation in the National Film Registry.

Plot 
Stan Laurel and Oliver Hardy are at a California meeting of the Sons of the Desert, a fraternal lodge of which they are members. The organization will hold its national convention in Chicago in a week and all members must take an oath to attend. Stan is reluctant for fear that his wife Betty won't allow the trip, but pledges after being cajoled by Oliver. During the cab ride home, Oliver tries to reassure Stan that Betty will have no other choice than to let him go, because he has taken a sacred oath. But Oliver's wife, Lottie, puts up stiff resistance. She has planned a trip with her husband to the mountains, and resorts to violence when Oliver dismisses her plan. Reluctant to go back on the oath he swore, but also unwilling to provoke more wrath from his wife, Oliver feigns illness to get out of the mountains trip. Stan arranges for a doctor, actually a veterinarian, to advise an ocean voyage to Honolulu while their wives stay home. Stan and Oliver instead go to Chicago, with their wives none the wiser. At the convention, the song "Honolulu Baby" is performed.

While Stan and Oliver are en-route home from Chicago, the ship returning from Honolulu which they are supposedly aboard sinks in a typhoon. Betty and Lottie go to the shipping company's offices to ask about survivors. Stan and Oliver, unaware of the shipwreck, return to their adjacent homes and are surprised to find them empty. Stan picks up a newspaper in which Oliver sees a report of the ship's loss and grasps its implications. Aware that their wives will know they didn't go to Honolulu, Stan and Oliver decide to spend the night in a hotel. Before they can leave, the wives return. The two men quickly hide in the attic of their duplex house.

Betty and Lottie go to a cinema to calm their nerves. Here, they see a newsreel of the Chicago convention which features their husbands. Furious at being deceived, each blames the other's wayward spouse, and the women challenge each other over whose husband will confess. When they get home, Stan and Oliver are still in the attic. Betty suspects burglars and investigates with a shotgun. The men escape to the rooftop, where Oliver decides to follow their original plan of going to a hotel. Stan, however, wants to confess to his wife. Oliver, afraid of Lottie's anger, manages to dissuade him by blackmail. Starting out for a hotel, Stan and Oliver are stopped by a policeman who gets their addresses from Stan and makes the pair return home. The wives see them coming. Lottie wants to shoot them, but Betty reminds her of the challenge to see which husband will confess.

In Oliver's home, he tries to persuade their wives that he and Stan are survivors of the shipwreck. When Oliver is asked how they got back a day ahead of the rescue ship carrying the survivors, his story begins to unravel. Betty asks Stan if Oliver's story is true. Stan tearfully confesses that they went to the convention, not to Honolulu. They were never in any shipwreck and had been hiding in the attic. Betty picks up her shotgun and ominously beckons to Stan. The two leave, with Stan still hysterically crying and fearful. But it turns out that Betty is pleased by his confession and, as she pampers him in their home, next door Lottie angrily throws pots, pans, and crockery at Oliver. Stan hears the commotion and eventually calls round. Irritated by Stan's lack of sympathy and his blithe departure singing "Honolulu Baby", Oliver hurls a pot at his head, knocking Stan over.

Production notes
The fraternal organization seen in the film is styled to resemble the Shriners, known formerly as the Ancient Arabic Order of the Nobles of the Mystic Shrine.

Cast

Soundtrack
 "Honolulu Baby" – written by T. Marvin Hatley
 "Auld Lang Syne" – written by Robert Burns
 "We Are the Sons of the Desert" – written by Marvin Hatley
 "Tramp! Tramp! Tramp!" – music and lyrics by George Frederick Root

Awards and honors
The film is recognized by American Film Institute in these lists:
 1998: AFI's 100 Years...100 Movies – Nominated
 2000: AFI's 100 Years...100 Laughs – #96
 2005: AFI's 100 Years...100 Movie Quotes:
 Oliver: "Well, here's another nice mess you've gotten me into!" – #60
 2007: AFI's 100 Years...100 Movies (10th Anniversary Edition) – Nominated

Similar films
 Sons of the Desert is a partial remake of 1928's We Faw Down.
 Another Laurel and Hardy short film called Be Big! has very much the same storyline as this feature. Stan and Ollie are invited to a party with a club that the two attend. However, they are about to take their wives on holiday for the weekend. Ollie pretends to be ill and makes sure the wives still go, the boys will meet them there the next day, and Stan stays to look after him. They get changed into their uniforms which causes many problems such as Stan putting on Ollie's boots by mistake. However, in Be Big, Stan is initially unaware of the party at their club until Ollie fills him in, and then tells him his sick act was a charade.

Legacy
The international Laurel and Hardy society The Sons of the Desert takes its name from this feature film.

The title was also used as the name of a country group, as well as that of the Danish comedy quartet "Ørkenens sønner" (1991–present), the literal translation of the movie's title. The comedy group uses the basic theme of a fraternal organization, and their stage costumes are identical to the ones used in the movie's organization. Even their theme song is a translation of the one from the movie. Though adult themed, their gags and jokes resemble the ones seen at the movie's Chicago party.

References

External links

 
 
 
 
 
 

1933 films
1933 comedy films
American black-and-white films
1930s English-language films
Films directed by William A. Seiter
Films about Freemasonry
Laurel and Hardy (film series)
Metro-Goldwyn-Mayer films
United States National Film Registry films
1930s American films